Wakisaka (written: 脇阪) is a Japanese surname. Notable people with the surname include:

, Japanese racing driver
, Japanese racing driver
, Japanese singer-songwriter based in the United States
, Japanese samurai and daimyō
, Japanese daimyō

Japanese-language surnames